Harbir Singh is an American economist, currently the Co-Director, Mack Institute for Innovation Management and Mack Professor of Management at Wharton School of the University of Pennsylvania and formerly the Edward H. Bowman Professor, from 1999 to 2005.

Bibliography

References

External links 
 The Best Management Is Less Management a 2018 strategy+business magazine article by Michael Useem and Harbir Singh on management lessons from the Chilean government’s response to crisis.

Year of birth missing (living people)
Living people
Wharton School of the University of Pennsylvania faculty
American economists